The Way the Crow Flies is the second novel by the Canadian writer and author Ann-Marie MacDonald. It was first published by Knopf Canada in 2003. The story revolves around a fictionalized version of the death of Lynne Harper, and the subsequent murder trial of Steven Truscott. The novel is set in the early 1960s predominantly at the Royal Canadian Air Force Station Centralia located in a small town near London, Ontario. In the story, the character Ricky Froelich, a Métis foster child, is the fictionalized version of Steven Truscott.

Reception 
The Way the Crow Flies was nominated for the 2003 Scotiabank Giller Prize and for the 2004 Lambda Literary Awards. The Book of the Month club selected it for distribution.

Overall, the book received mostly positive reviews. In The Guardian, Aida Edemariam wrote that "the novel is a thriller, too, as tightly wrought and formal as a Hitchcock storyboard, all the way to the sudden vertiginous surprise at the end". However, Edemariam stated, "MacDonald can be heavy-handed with the historical context, especially in the clunky first chapter". Edemariam concluded that "The Way the Crow Flies is, in the end, moving and compulsively readable". Writing for the Canadian magazine Quill & Quire, Bronwyn Drainie stated that "for the most part, this is an engrossing and ingeniously plotted portrait of a 'perfect' 1960s Canadian family coming to terms with all its imperfections". Drainie wrote that, while "the first three-quarters of The Way the Crow Flies are solid and captivating, the final quarter [is] a somewhat disappointing and navel-gazing denouement".

References

External links
 Ann-Marie MacDonald official website
 Publisher's official website
 Ann-Marie MacDonald Bio

2003 Canadian novels
Novels by Ann-Marie MacDonald
Knopf Canada books
Novels set in Ontario
Novels based on actual events
Canadian crime novels